"I Made It (Cash Money Heroes)" is the first single from Kevin Rudolf's second studio album To the Sky. The single features Cash Money artists Birdman, Jay Sean and Lil Wayne. It was released on February 2, 2010.

Music video
The music video debuted on March 18, 2010 on BET although it had been on YouTube since February 25.

Chart performance
On February 11, 2010 it debuted on the United States Billboard Hot 100 at #59 and climbed to peak at #21. It also reached #17 on the Pop Songs. In Canada, it debuted at #71 on the Canadian Hot 100 and has reached #44. On the issue dated April 5, 2010, the song debuted at number four in Australia, marking the second top-five hit for Rudolf on the ARIA Singles Chart.

"I Made It" began climbing the UK Singles Chart in April 2010, reaching #68 on 2 May 2010. The following week, the single climbed to #37, marking Kevin Rudolf's second Top 40 single in the UK.

Year-end charts

Certifications

In other media
In 2010, "I Made It (Cash Money Heroes)" was used as the official theme song for the WWE pay-per-view WrestleMania XXVI, promos for the 2010 US Open, and the Madden NFL 11 trailer.  2019 World Snooker Champion Judd Trump uses this as his walk-on music in snooker.

References

External links

2010 singles
Kevin Rudolf songs
Birdman (rapper) songs
Jay Sean songs
Lil Wayne songs
Cash Money Records singles
Songs written by Lil Wayne
Songs written by Jay Sean
Songs written by Kevin Rudolf
Songs written by Birdman (rapper)
2009 songs